Dina Katabi is the Andrew and Erna Viterbi Professor of Electrical Engineering and Computer Science at MIT and the director of the MIT Wireless Center.

Academic biography
Katabi received a bachelor's degree from the University of Damascus in 1995 and M.S and Ph.D. in Computer Science from MIT in 1998 and 2003 respectively. In 2003, Katabi joined MIT, where she holds the title of Professor in the Department of Electrical Engineering and Computer Science. She is the co-director of the MIT Center for Wireless Networks and Mobile Computing and a principal investigator at MIT's Computer Science and Artificial Intelligence Laboratory.

Awards
In 2013, Katabi won the Grace Murray Hopper Award, recognizing her as the outstanding young computer science professional.

In 2012, her work on Sparse Fourier Transforms was chosen as one of the top 10 breakthroughs of the year by Technology Review.

In September 2013, Katabi was awarded a MacArthur Fellowship for her work. In 2013 she also became a fellow of the Association for Computing Machinery.

In 2014, on the celebration of Project Mac's 50th anniversary, her work on X-ray vision was chosen as one of the "50 ways that MIT has transformed computer science."

In 2015, Katabi presented her startup idea to President Obama at White House demo day.

In 2017, she was elected a member of the National Academy of Engineering for contributions to network congestion control and to wireless communications.

In 2017, Katabi was awarded the ACM Prize in Computing, recognizing her as "one of the most innovative researchers in the field of networking, Katabi applies methods from communication theory, signal processing and machine learning to solve problems in wireless networking".

References

External links 
Dina Katabi's CSAIL homepage at MIT
MIT Center for Wireless Networks and Mobile Computing

American computer scientists
Syrian emigrants to the United States
Syrian computer scientists
Syrian women scientists
Living people
MIT School of Engineering faculty
MacArthur Fellows
Syrian women computer scientists
Fellows of the Association for Computing Machinery
Members of the United States National Academy of Engineering
1970 births
21st-century American women scientists
21st-century American scientists
Sloan Research Fellows
American women academics
MIT Computer Science and Artificial Intelligence Laboratory people